Jarnsaxa , also known as Saturn L (provisional designation S/2006 S 6), is a natural satellite of Saturn. Its discovery was announced by Scott S. Sheppard, David C. Jewitt, Jan Kleyna, and Brian G. Marsden on June 26, 2006, from observations taken between January 5 and April 29, 2006.

Jarnsaxa is about 6 kilometres in diameter, and orbits Saturn at an average distance of 18,556.9 Mm in 943.784 days, at an inclination of 162.9° to the ecliptic (164.1° to Saturn's equator), in a retrograde direction and with an eccentricity of 0.1918. It is a member of the Norse group of irregular satellites.

It is named after Járnsaxa, a giantess in Norse mythology.

References

 Institute for Astronomy Saturn Satellite Data
 IAUC 8727: Satellites of Saturn June 30, 2006 (discovery)
 MPEC 2006-M45: Eight New Satellites of Saturn June 26, 2006 (discovery and ephemeris)
 MPEC 2007-D79: S/2006 S 6 February 28, 2007 (recovery)
 IAUC 8873: Satellites of Saturn September 20, 2007 (naming)

Norse group
Moons of Saturn
Irregular satellites
Discoveries by Scott S. Sheppard
Astronomical objects discovered in 2006
Moons with a retrograde orbit